John "Johnnie" Bevan (born November 1, 1976) is an American former competitive figure skater. He finished in the top six at two World Junior Championships.

Personal life 
Bevan was born on November 1, 1976. He married Kathy Larsen, with whom he has two children, Kendall and Drew.

Career 
Bevan began skating at age three. Early in his career, he was coached by Joan Bellessa at the Lilac City FSC in Spokane, Washington. Competing in men's singles, he won the U.S. junior national bronze medal in 1993 and 1994. He placed fourth at the 1993 World Junior Championships in Seoul, South Korea, and sixth at the 1994 World Junior Championships in Colorado Springs, Colorado.

Bevan withdrew from the 1995 World Junior Championships in Budapest, Hungary. By 2000, he was coached by Frank Carroll in El Segundo, California.

Bevan competed briefly in pair skating with Jacqueline Matson. They placed 11th in junior pairs at the 2002 U.S. Championships.

Competitive highlights

References 

1976 births
American male single skaters
Living people
Sportspeople from Spokane, Washington